The use of the title of Princess of the United Kingdom of Great Britain and Northern Ireland is entirely at the will of the sovereign as expressed in letters patent. Individuals holding the title of princess are styled "Her Royal Highness" (HRH). On 18 April 1917, Frederica of Hanover, the newest granddaughter of Wilhelm II, German Emperor was styled a British princess from birth, even though Germany and Britain were fighting in WWI. Before the First World War, British princesses also held additional German titles, such as princesses of Hanover by virtue of being male line descendants of George III; or princesses of Saxe-Coburg and Gotha, duchess of Saxony, by virtue of being male line descendants of Prince Albert of Saxe-Coburg and Gotha. George V issued letters patent on 30 November 1917, to restrict the automatic assignment of the title "princess" and the use of the style "Royal Highness" to the following persons:

 the legitimate daughters of a British sovereign,
 the legitimate male line granddaughters of a British sovereign,
 the wife of a British prince.

On 31 December 2012, Queen Elizabeth II issued letters patent enabling all children of the eldest son of the prince of Wales to enjoy the princely title and style of Royal Highness, as opposed to only the eldest son.

Princesses of the royal blood and princesses by marriage
Under the current practice, princesses of the royal blood are the legitimate daughters and the legitimate male line granddaughters of a British sovereign. They are dynasts, that is potential successors to the throne. For these individuals, the title "Princess of the United Kingdom of Great Britain and Northern Ireland" and the style "Her Royal Highness" is an entitlement for life. The title Princess and the style Royal Highness is prefixed to the Christian name, before another title of honour. From 1714 until 1917, the male-line great-granddaughters of the Sovereign were titled "Princess of Great Britain and Ireland" with the style "Highness". Since 1917, the male-line great-granddaughters of the Sovereign have held "the style and title enjoyed by the children of dukes". For example, the daughters of Prince Richard, Duke of Gloucester, a male line grandson of George V, are styled Lady Davina Windsor and Lady Rose Gilman.

Princesses by marriage are the recognised wives of the sovereign's sons and male-line grandsons. Generally, these women are entitled to the style "Royal Highness" by virtue of marriage, and retain the style if widowed. However, Elizabeth II issued letters patent dated 21 August 1996 stating that any woman divorced from a prince of the United Kingdom would no longer be entitled to the style "Royal Highness". This has so far applied to Diana, Princess of Wales, and Sarah, Duchess of York.

Since the passage of the Royal Marriages Act 1772, there have been several instances in which princes of the blood contracted marriages in contravention of that act, to women deemed unsuitable to be a royal wife. This meant they were not legally married, and would allow the Sovereign to withhold the style "Her Royal Highness" from the bride, as well as any title in the peerage held by the groom. For example, Prince George, Duke of Cambridge, a male-line grandson of King George III, 'married' Sarah Louisa Fairbrother: the marriage was in contravention of the Royal Marriages Act, and therefore legally invalid. Accordingly, the duke's wife was never titled the Duchess of Cambridge or accorded the style "Her Royal Highness". Instead, she was known as "Mrs FitzGeorge". An exception to the rule was created for King Edward VIII following his 1936 abdication. King George VI issued letters patent dated 27 May 1937 that entitled The Duke of Windsor, as Edward was now entitled, "to hold and enjoy for himself only the title style or attribute of Royal Highness so however that his wife and descendants if any shall not hold the said title style or attribute".

The wife of a prince of the blood takes her husband's Christian name in her title as do all married royal women. For example, upon her marriage to Prince Michael of Kent in 1978, Baroness Marie-Christine von Reibnitz assumed the title and style of "Her Royal Highness Princess Michael of Kent". Similarly, upon her marriage to then Prince Richard of Gloucester, the former Birgitte van Deurs assumed the title and style of "Her Royal Highness Princess Richard of Gloucester". Upon marriage, the wife of the prince of Wales becomes "Her Royal Highness The Princess of Wales". Upon marriage, the wife of a royal duke (or earl) becomes "Her Royal Highness The Duchess (or Countess) of X". When Prince Richard of Gloucester succeeded to his father's dukedom in 1974, his wife became "Her Royal Highness The Duchess of Gloucester".

There is also the case when a princess of blood royal marries a British prince.  She also becomes a princess by marriage and will be addressed in the same way.  An example of this situation was the late Princess Alexandra, Duchess of Fife, when she married her cousin Prince Arthur of Connaught and became "Princess Arthur of Connaught, Duchess of Fife".

Typically a princess by marriage should not be called princess followed by her first name. Diana, Princess of Wales, was consistently referred to as "Princess Diana" by fans and the media, but the use of this title is completely erroneous, as she was not the child of a monarch nor the child of a son of a monarch. However, this tradition was broken once in the past century with Elizabeth II's aunt, Princess Alice, Duchess of Gloucester, being referred to—with permission from the sovereign—in official sources as such following the death of her husband.

History
The use of the titles prince and princess and the styles of Highness and Royal Highness for members of the Royal Family is of fairly recent usage in the British Isles. Before 1714, there was no settled practice regarding the use of the titles prince and princess other than the heir apparent and his wife. From 1301 onward, the eldest sons of the Kings of England (and later Great Britain and the United Kingdom) have generally been created Prince of Wales and Earl of Chester. Their wives were titled Princess of Wales.

The title Princess Royal came into being in 1642 when Queen Henrietta Maria, the French-born wife of King Charles I, wished to imitate the way the eldest daughter of the French King was styled (Madame Royale). However, there was no settled practice on the use of the title princess for the Sovereign's younger daughters or male-line granddaughters. For example, as late as the time of King Charles II, the daughters of his brother James, Duke of York, both of whom became Queens regnant, were called simply "The Lady Mary" and "The Lady Anne". The future Queen Anne was styled princess in her marriage treaty to Prince George of Denmark and then styled "Princess Anne of Denmark" once married. However, in exile at Saint-Germain-en-Laye the deposed James II & VII gave the title of Princess Royal to his last daughter, Louisa Maria (1692–1712).

After the accession of George Louis of Hanover as King George I, the princely titles were changed to follow the German practice. The children, grandchildren, and male line great-grandchildren of the British Sovereign were automatically titled "Prince or Princess of Great Britain and Ireland" and styled "Royal Highness" (in the case of children and grandchildren) or "Highness" (in the case of male line great-grandchildren). Queen Victoria confirmed this practice in letters patent dated 30 January 1864 (the first Act of the Prerogative dealing with the princely title in general terms).

On 31 December 2012, Elizabeth II issued letters patent enabling all children of the eldest son of the Prince of Wales to enjoy the princely title and style of Royal Highness, as opposed to only the eldest son.

Styling of princesses

Princesses of the royal blood 
Daughter of a Sovereign: HRH The Princess N.
The style HRH The Princess Royal is customarily (but not automatically) granted by the Sovereign, when vacant, to the Sovereign's eldest daughter.
Daughter of a son of a Sovereign: HRH Princess N of X, where X is the territorial designation of their father's senior peerage; e.g. HRH Princess Alexandra of Kent.
Prior to Princess Charlotte, a daughter of the Prince of Wales: HRH Princess N
Prior to 1917, a daughter of a son of a son of a Sovereign: HH Princess N of X
From 31 December 2012, daughter of the eldest son of the Prince of Wales: HRH Princess N of X.

When a princess marries, she still takes on her husband's title. If the title is higher than (or equal to) the one she possesses, she will normally be styled using the female equivalent. If her husband has a lower title or style, her style as a princess remains in use, although it may then be combined with her style by marriage, e.g. HRH The Princess Louise, Duchess of Argyll or HRH Princess Alice, Countess of Athlone – if that princess had a territorial designation, she may cease its use. It has become customary, however, for a princess who has been granted the title of HRH The Princess Royal to not combine it with her style by marriage: Princess Anne remains HRH The Princess Royal rather than HRH The Princess Royal, Lady Laurence.

Princesses by marriage 
A princess by marriage is addressed as "Princess Husband's name"; this is akin to a woman being referred to as "Mrs. John Smith". The only recent time this has broken tradition is with the sovereign's express consent. Namely, with Queen Elizabeth II's aunts Princess Alice, Duchess of Gloucester, and Princess Marina, Duchess of Kent. The former was not a princess by birth, while the latter was born a princess of Greece and Denmark. Both women asked the Queen to use their given names after their husbands' deaths.

Wife of a prince who has a peerage: HRH The Duchess/Countess of X, or, prior to 1917, possibly HH
Since 1996, divorced wife of a prince who held a peerage: N, Duchess/Countess of X. (e.g. Diana, Princess of Wales, and Sarah, Duchess of York)
Wife of a son of a Sovereign, who has no peerage: HRH The Princess Husband.
Wife of another prince who has no peerage: HRH Princess Husband of X. (X usually taken from father's Dukedom)
Prior to 1917, the wife of a prince in the third generation, who has no peerage: HH Princess Husband of X.

Exceptions
 There were only two historical princesses who would have been exceptions to the 1917 rule, but they died long before that. The sisters Sophia Matilda and Caroline Augusta Maria born in 1773 and 1774 were male line great-granddaughters of George II. All of the other exceptions were still alive in 1917 and were no longer permitted to use the style of HRH and Princess.

There have been several exceptions in recent history to these rules, but all have come by order of the Sovereign, mostly through letters patent. 
In November 1905, King Edward VII allowed the two daughters of Louise, Princess Royal to use a princely title and the style of Highness. They were not entitled to the style of Royal Highness. The 1917 letters patent which stripped great-grandchildren of a British sovereign of the style of Highness with a princely title was complicated as it did not technically overrule Edward VII's letters patent, as the former practice was mostly an unspoken courtesy as opposed to a written rule. The elder sister, Princess Alexandra, Duchess of Fife, was already married by that time, to Prince Arthur of Connaught: he was a male-line grandson of Victoria, and so entitled to use the style of Royal Highness. Alexandra was therefore styled Her Royal Highness Princess Arthur of Connaught from her 1913 marriage for the rest of her life, and the 1917 letters patent did not change this. Her younger sister, Princess Maud, on the other hand, was unmarried in 1917. Until her 1923 marriage, she continued to use the title of "Princess" granted to her in 1905. Upon her marriage to Charles, Lord Carnegie, however, she chose to be known as Lady Maud Carnegie (or, from 1941, The Countess of Southesk), dropping her princely title.
Anne, Princess Royal, had the style and title Her Royal Highness Princess Anne of Edinburgh from birth in 1950, even though she was a female-line grandchild of the Sovereign, being born to the future Elizabeth II, then Princess Elizabeth, Duchess of Edinburgh, during the reign of Elizabeth's father, King George VI, who had no sons. George VI issued letters patent on 22 October 1948, granting the style to Elizabeth's children.
In 1961, when her son married, the Duchess of Kent asked Elizabeth II to extend the use of a princely title to precede her first name, in order to avoid confusion with her daughter-in-law, Katharine Worsley, the new Duchess of Kent. As she was born a princess of Greece and Denmark, this was not incredibly notable, although traditionally she would have been styled as Her Royal Highness The Dowager Duchess of Kent. After this she was styled as Her Royal Highness Princess Marina, Duchess of Kent. 
In 1974, the Duchess of Gloucester asked Elizabeth II for the same title as her sister-in-law, then Princess Marina, Duchess of Kent, with a princely title preceding her first name. Unlike Princess Marina, Alice had never been a princess in her own right, thus this allowance was far more unusual. Instead of being referred to as Her Royal Highness The Dowager Duchess of Gloucester, as is customary, she became Her Royal Highness Princess Alice, Duchess of Gloucester.
In 2003, upon the request of Elizabeth II's youngest son, Edward, the Queen retracted the style of Royal Highness and princely title from all children born to him. As male-line grandchildren of a British monarch, Lady Louise Mountbatten-Windsor and the Earl of Wessex, would traditionally enjoy a princely title and style.
In December 2012, Elizabeth II issued letters patent that stated that all children born to the eldest child of the Prince of Wales (then her son Charles), would enjoy a princely title and style, and not just the eldest son. Although in effect since 2012, it was not used in practice until the birth of Princess Charlotte in 2015.

List of princesses of the blood royal since 1714

List of princesses by marriage since 1714

Notes
Each of the following women married a royal prince but as their marriages were invalid under the Royal Marriages Act 1772, they did not become princesses:
 Maria Anne Fitzherbert, married George, Prince of Wales in 1785
 Lady Augusta Murray, married Prince Augustus Frederick, Duke of Sussex in 1793
 Lady Cecilia Buggin, married Prince Augustus Frederick, Duke of Sussex. She was later created Duchess of Inverness.
 Sarah Louisa Fairbrother, married Prince George, Duke of Cambridge in 1847

Although Wallis Simpson married the Duke of Windsor in 1937, and he was a British prince with the style His Royal Highness, having been confirmed as such by letters patent 27 May 1937 from his brother, George VI, Wallis and her descendants from the marriage were expressly denied the style of "Royal Highness" by the same letters patent before she married him. As a duke's wife, she was always styled Her Grace The Duchess of Windsor. Her husband, the Duke of Windsor, insisted that staff and friends should refer to her as Her Royal Highness.

There have been two instances where a British princess married a British prince: first The Princess Mary, daughter of George III, who married her first cousin Prince William Frederick, Duke of Gloucester and Edinburgh; secondly Princess Alexandra, Duchess of Fife, granddaughter of Edward VII, who married her first cousin once removed Prince Arthur of Connaught. In the first instance Princess Mary was of higher rank and the Duke of Gloucester and his sister were elevated from the style His/Her Highness to His/Her Royal Highness. In the second instance Princess Alexandra had been granted the style Her Highness by her grandfather the King; as the wife of a Prince she received the style Her Royal Highness.

There is also the curious case of Princess Victoria Eugénie of Battenberg, later Queen Victoria Eugenia of Spain (the daughter of Princess Beatrice and Prince Henry of Battenberg). Prior to her marriage to Alfonso XIII of Spain in May 1906, she was styled Her Highness Princess Victoria Eugénie of Battenberg. On 3 April 1906 Edward VII, in order to elevate her standing prior to her wedding, raised her status to Royal Highness per royal declaration which read: "Whitehall April 3, 1906. The KING has been graciously pleased to declare and ordain that His Majesty's niece, Her Highness Princess Victoria Eugenie Julia Ena, daughter of Her Royal Highness the Princess Beatrice Mary Victoria Feodore (Princess Henry of Battenberg), shall henceforth be styled and called "Her Royal Highness"; And to command that the said Royal concession and declaration be registered in His Majesty's College of Arms." Edward VII concurrently issued a Royal Warrant on the elevation which read: "Our Will and Pleasure is and we do hereby declare and ordain that from and after the date of this Warrant our most Dear Niece Princess Victoria Eugénie Julia Ena, only daughter of Our most Dear Sister Beatrice Mary Victoria Feodore (Princess Henry of Battenberg) shall be styled entitled and called "Her Royal Highness" before her name and such Titles and Appellations which to her belong in all Deeds Records Instruments or Documents whatsoever wherein she may at any time hereafter be named or described. And We do hereby authorize and empower Our said most Dear Niece henceforth at all times to assume and use and to be called and named by the Style, Title and Appellation of "Her Royal Highness" accordingly. Given at Our Court of Saint James's, the Third day of April 1906: in the Sixth Year of Our Reign. By His Majesty's Command. M Gladstone" Whether this made her a British Royal Princess is the subject of debate.

The former Lady Diana Spencer lost the prefix of Her Royal Highness upon her divorce in August 1996, and was restyled as "Diana, Princess of Wales". Buckingham Palace issued a press release on the day the decree absolute of divorce was issued, announcing Diana's change of title, but made it clear that Diana continued to be a member of the British Royal Family. This was confirmed by the deputy coroner of the Queen's Household, Baroness Butler-Sloss, after a pre-hearing on 8 January 2007: "I am satisfied that at her death, Diana, Princess of Wales continued to be a member of the Royal Household." This appears to have been confirmed in the High Court judicial review matter of Al Fayed & Ors v Butler-Sloss. In that case, three High Court judges accepted submissions that the "very name 'Coroner to the Queen's Household' gave the appearance of partiality in the context of inquests into the deaths of two people, one of whom was a member of the Family and the other was not."

Common names

Of the above named princesses, there are a great number of shared names:
   
 Mary, or similar (like Marie and Maria, usually ultimately after Mary, mother of Jesus), occurs thirty-one times – Queen Mary; her daughter, Mary, Princess Royal; Queen Alexandra; Queen Victoria's daughter, Victoria, Princess Royal and her mother, Princess Victoria, Duchess of Kent;, Queen Elizabeth II; and, currently, Princess Beatrice of York; Lady Louise Mountbatten-Windsor; The Duchess of Kent and Princess Michael of Kent among them.
 Louise (or Louisa) is borne by twenty-six – including Queen Louise of Denmark; Queen Victoria's daughters, Princess Louise, Duchess of Argyll and Victoria, Princess Royal, and her mother, Princess Victoria, Duchess of Kent; Louise, Princess Royal; Princess Louise, Duchess of Connaught; Queens Mary, Alexandra and Adelaide; and, currently, Lady Louise Mountbatten-Windsor and Anne, Princess Royal.
 Victoria is the name of twenty-five princesses, nineteen of whom are named for Queen Victoria – among these being her four daughters (including "Vicky", Princess Royal); her granddaughter, The Princess Victoria; Mary, Princess Royal; and, currently, Princess Eugenie. Among those not named for the queen are her mother, Princess Victoria, Duchess of Kent and Queen Mary.
 Others include Charlotte; Alexandra (and Alexandrina); Augusta; Elizabeth; Caroline; Sophie (and Sophia); Matilda (or Maud); Alice; Frederica; Helena; Beatrice; Olga; Feodora; Alberta; and Adelaide.

See also
 British prince
 House of Windsor

Sources

British monarchy
Lists of princesses